Enolmis delicatella is a moth of the family Scythrididae. It was described by Hans Rebel in 1901. It is found in Portugal and Spain.

References

Scythrididae
Moths described in 1901